is a passenger railway station in the town of Shibayama, Chiba Prefecture, Japan, operated by the private railway operator Shibayama Railway. It is situated on the eastern boundary of Narita International Airport.

Lines

Station layout

The station has one elevated platform serving a single-track line.

History
The station opened on 27 October 2002.

Passenger statistics
In fiscal 2019, the station was used by an average of 1435 passengers daily.

Surrounding area
Shibayama-Chiyoda Station is located near Gate No. 6 to Narita Airport, which serves the South Cargo Area and the Japan Airlines and All Nippon Airways aircraft maintenance facilities. It is also the closest railway station to the Museum of Aeronautical Sciences, five minutes away by shuttle bus.

See also
 List of railway stations in Japan

References

External links

 Shibayama Railway station information 

Railway stations in Chiba Prefecture
Railway stations in Japan opened in 2002
Shibayama, Chiba